Esporte Clube Cruzeiro, commonly referred to as Cruzeiro-RS, is a Brazilian football club based in Cachoeirinha, Rio Grande do Sul. It currently plays in Campeonato Gaúcho Série A2, the second level of the Rio Grande do Sul state football league.

It was founded in 1913, preceding Cruzeiro Esporte Clube from Belo Horizonte, the most famous team of the same name. Cruzeiro won the 1929 Campeonato Gaúcho. In the 1953 the team was the first from Rio Grande do Sul to tour Europe and in 1960, the club won an international friendly tournament in East Germany, known as the "Torneio de Páscoa" (Easter Tournament) against multiple teams from Eastern and Western Germany.

History
The club was founded on July 14, 1913, in Porto Alegre. From 1913 to 2018, the team was based in Porto Alegre, being one of the main teams in the city along with Grêmio, Internacional and São José. It was one of the main powers of the state until it entered a period of decline in the 1960s. They won the Campeonato Gaúcho in 1929, and the Second Level in 2010. Cruzeiro competed in the Série D in 2011, when the club was eliminated in the first stage of the competition.

João de Assis Moreira, the father of the legendary Brazilian footballer Ronaldinho, had a brief spell with the club.

In 2012, construction began on a new stadium in the city of Cachoeirinha, located in the metropolitan area of Porto Alegre. The Arena Cruzeiro, which was inaugurated on March 13, 2019.

Achievements

 Campeonato Gaúcho:
 Winners (1): 1929
 Campeonato Gaúcho Second Level:
 Winners (1): 2010
 Copa Metropolitana:
 Winners (1): 2015

Stadium
Esporte Clube Cruzeiro plays their home games at Arena Cruzeiro. The stadium has a maximum capacity of 16,000 people. Previously, they played in Estrelão.

References

 
Football clubs in Brazil
Football clubs in Rio Grande do Sul
Football clubs in Porto Alegre
Association football clubs established in 1913
1913 establishments in Brazil